The 9th Oceania Swimming Championships  were May 28-June 3, 2012 in Nouméa, New Caledonia. The Championships featured competition in Swimming, Open Water Swimming and Synchronized Swimming. Swimming was held at the CARD Guy Verlaguet pool in Dumbéa, Synchro was held at a pool in Ouen-Toro park, and the Open Water races were swum in the waters off Baie des Citrons (5K) and Anse-Vata (10K).

The 2012 edition marks the third time that Nouméa has hosted the event, after hosting in 1993 and 2002.

Participating nations
14 nations and 2 affiliated members of the Oceania Swimming Association participated in the Championships:
(Note: Number listed is Swimming team sizes, unless otherwise referenced.)

 (8)

 New Caledonia (24)

Competition schedule

Results

Swimming
A total of 40 swimming events were contested in a long course (50m) pool. Similar to other international competitions, each nation was allowed to have only 2 swimmers advance through to a final in any individual event (additional swimmers could advance into the B final, or empty lanes, put were considered exhibition). In the relay events it was one medal per country. So, for example, if New Zealand 'A' finishes first, Australia 'A' finishes second, New Zealand 'B' finishes third and New Caledonia finishes fourth, New Caledonia would be awarded the bronze medal.

Key
 CR - Championship record
 NR - National record

Men's events

Women's events

Mixed event

Open Water Swimming

Men

Women

Synchronized Swimming

Medal Tally

Note: Swimming-only currently listed (Australia with 64 total).

Records broken

Championship records

See also
 List of Oceania Championships records in swimming

References

Oceania Swimming Championships, 2012
Oceania
Oceania Swimming Championships, 2012
Oceania Swimming Championships
International aquatics competitions hosted by New Caledonia
2012 in New Caledonian sport
May 2012 sports events in Oceania
June 2012 sports events in Oceania